Sherbaz Khan Abbasi, also known as Baz Khan, was a leader of the Dhund Abbasi tribe of Northern Punjab during the time of the British Raj. 

Sherbaz Khan planned to attack the British settlement of Murree in July 1857 during the uprising against British colonial rule - with a force of 300 men, but his plans were leaked to the British and his plans were thwarted, and he was captured by the British. He was subsequently tried, sentenced and hanged him placed in front of cannons and shot to bits.

References

External links
Tribes and Language (Dhund Abbasi tribe)

Year of birth missing
1857 deaths
Revolutionaries of the Indian Rebellion of 1857
Dhund Abbasi
Indian independence activists from Pakistan